The following is a list of massacres that have occurred in the territory of present-day Romania (numbers may be approximate):

See also
 1848–1849 massacres in Transylvania

References

Romania
Massacres

Massacres